Jewish Welfare Board may refer to:

 National Jewish Welfare Board, a U.S. organisation
 Jewish Welfare Board, a UK organisation, since 1990 part of the charity Jewish Care
 Jewish Welfare Board (Singapore); see List of voluntary welfare organisations in Singapore